Imlil may refer to one of two villages in Morocco:
Imlil, Marrakesh-Safi
Imlil, Béni Mellal-Khénifra